Max Kanter (born 22 October 1997 in Cottbus) is a German cyclist.

Biography

He currently rides for UCI WorldTeam .

In October 2020, he was named in the startlist for the 2020 Vuelta a España, which was his first Grand Tour.

Results

2015
 1st Overall Driedaagse van Axel
 1st Overall La Coupe du Président de la Ville de Grudziadz
 1st Stage 2 Grand Prix Rüebliland
 1st Stage 3 Niedersachsen-Rundfahrt der Junioren
 3rd  Omnium, UCI Juniors Track World Championships
2016
 3rd Overall Carpathian Couriers Race
1st  Young rider classification
2017
 1st  Road race, National Under-23 Road Championships
 7th Paris–Tours Espoirs
2018
 National Under-23 Road Championships
1st  Road race
2nd Time trial
 Olympia's Tour
1st  Points classification
1st Stages 2 & 4
 1st Stage 1 Tour de l'Avenir
 2nd Ronde van Vlaanderen U23
 3rd ZLM Tour
 3rd Ronde van Overijssel
 4th Overall Boucles de la Mayenne
 6th Trofej Umag
 8th Ghent–Wevelgem U23
2022
 1st  Points classification, Route d'Occitanie
 3rd Primus Classic
 3rd Gooikse Pijl
 4th Milano–Torino
 9th BEMER Cyclassics
 9th Münsterland Giro
 10th Clásica de Almería
 10th Omloop van het Houtland
2023
 6th Trofeo Ses Salines–Alcúdia

Grand Tour general classification results timeline

References

External links

1997 births
Living people
German male cyclists
Sportspeople from Cottbus
People from Bezirk Cottbus
Cyclists from Brandenburg
21st-century German people